The  was an aircraft and airbase garrison unit of the Imperial Japanese Navy (IJN) during the Pacific campaign of World War II.

First generation (ex-Mihoro Naval Air Group)

Structure
Higher unit
22nd Air Flotilla (1 November 1942–15 March 1943, dissolved.)
Commanding officers
Capt. Yamada Yutaka  (49) - 1 November 1942 - 15 March 1943

Second Generation (ex-Toyohashi Naval Air Group)

Structure
Higher unit
51st Carrier Division (20 February 1944–14 November 1944)
25th Air Flotilla (15 November 1944–9 February 1945)
5th Air Fleet (10 February 1945–postwar)
Lower unit
305th Fighter Squadron (20 March 1945–5 May 1945)
311th Fighter Squadron (5 March 1945–24 May 1945)
5th Attack Squadron (5 January 1945–9 February 1945)
102nd Attack Squadron (1 October 1944–9 December 1944)
103rd Attack Squadron (1 October 1944–postwar.)
105th Attack Squadron (10 February 1945–postwar.)
251st Attack Squadron (10 February 1945–19 April 1945)
252nd Attack Squadron (1 October 1944–14 December 1944)
256th Attack Squadron (1 January 1945–9 February 1945)
406th Attack Squadron (25 January 1945–9 February 1945)
702nd Attack Squadron (1 April 1944–9 October 1944)
3rd Reconnaissance Squadron (15 November 1944–9 February 1945)
Commanding officers
Capt. Yamada Yutaka (49) - 20 February 1944 - 5 September 1944
Capt. Kida Tatsuhiko (50) - 5 September 1944 - 29 May 1945
Capt. Enoo Yoshio (51) - 29 May 1945 - 15 August 1945

Footnotes

Bibliography
The Japanese Modern Historical Manuscripts Association, Organizations, structures and personnel affairs of the Imperial Japanese Army & Navy, University of Tokyo Press, Tōkyō, Japan, 1971, .
Bunrin-Dō Co., Ltd., Tōkyō, Japan.
Famous airplanes of the world
No. 59, Type 1 Attack Bomber, 1996, .
No. 91, Type 96 Attack Bomber, 2001, .
Koku-Fan Illustrated No. 42, Japanese Imperial Army & Navy Aircraft Color, Markig, 1988.
Model Art, Model Art Co. Ltd., Tōkyō, Japan.
No. 406, Special issue Camouflage & Markings of Imperial Japanese Navy Bombers in W.W.II, 1993.
No. 458, Special issue Imperial Japanese Navy Air Force Suicide Attack Unit "Kamikaze", 1995.
No. 553, Special issue I.J.N. Carrier Attack Bomber, 2000.
Heihachi Yoshitake (One of the members of the Mihoro Naval Air Group), Biography of the Mihoro Naval Air Group, K.K. Art Insatsu, Bihoro, Japan, 1982.
Alumni Association of the 705th Naval Air group, History of the 705th Naval Air Group, Sougo Insatsu Kougei K.K., Tokyo, Japan, 1985.
Japan Center for Asian Historical Records (http://www.jacar.go.jp/english/index.html), National Archives of Japan, Tōkyō, Japan.
Reference Code: C08051771200, Transition table of formation of Imperial Japan Navy Air Units (special establishment) during Pacific War, Japan Demobilization Agency, 1949.

Groups of the Imperial Japanese Navy Air Service
Military units and formations established in 1942
Military units and formations established in 1944
Military units and formations disestablished in 1943